The Dienstagische Kurant was the earliest known Yiddish language periodical. It was a semi-weekly founded in Amsterdam in 1686, and it lasted for only two years. It covered local news and news from other Jewish communities, including those as far away as India.

References

Sources
Liptzin, Sol, A History of Yiddish Literature, Jonathan David Publishers, Middle Village, NY, 1972, .

Ashkenazi Jewish culture in the Netherlands
Jewish Dutch history
Jews and Judaism in Amsterdam
Kuranten
Yiddish culture in the Netherlands